KTTK may refer to:

 The Keys to the Kingdom
 KTTK (FM), a radio station (90.7 FM) licensed to Lebanon, Missouri, United States